The Eparchy of Parma is a Ruthenian Greek Catholic Church ecclesiastical territory or eparchy of the Catholic Church in the United States. Its episcopal seat is the Cathedral of St. John the Baptist in Parma, Ohio.

It is a suffragan diocese in the ecclesiastical province of the metropolitan Archeparchy of Pittsburgh (and dependent upon the Roman Congregation for the Oriental Churches) and is the eparchy for the Midwestern United States. While not the only Byzantine Rite Eastern Catholic eparchy with the episcopal see of Parma, the eeparchy is sometimes styled as the "Byzantine Catholic Eparchy of Parma", referring to the title the Ruthenian Greek Catholic Church uses in the United States.

Statistics 

, the Byzantine Catholic Eparchy of Parma pastorally served 9,020 Eastern Catholics in Illinois, Indiana, Kansas, Michigan, Minnesota, Missouri and Ohio in 28 parishes and 5 missions with 36 priests (diocesan), 16 deacons, 6 lay religious (6 sisters), 2 seminarians. Ten parishes in the Youngstown, Ohio area are part of the Byzantine Catholic Archeparchy of Pittsburgh.

History 
 The eparchy was erected on 21 February 1969 by Pope Paul VI as the Eparchy of Parma (of the Ruthenians)  / Eparchia Parmen(sis) Ruthenorum (Latin), on US territory split off from its present Metropolitan, then the Eparchy (Diocese) of Pittsburgh). On 22 March 1969, Father John Mihalik was appointed as its first ordinary. He was consecrated as its eparch by Archbishop Stephen Kocisko on 12 June 1969. On 30 May 1983, Father Andrew Pataki was appointed as the Auxiliary Bishop of the Eparchy of Passaic and consecrated by Kocisko on 23 August 1983 with the title of Titular Bishop of Telmissus. When Mihalik died on 27 January 1984 Parma's see became sede vacante. Pataki was appointed as the eparch on June 19, 1984 and was installed on August 16, 1985.
 The eparchy lost ecclesiastical territory on 3 December 1981 when the Eparchy of Van Nuys was erected.

Episcopal Ordinaries 
The following bishops have been appointed as ordinaries of Parma eparchy.

 Emil John Mihalik (1969-1984)
 Andrew Pataki (1984-1995), appointed Bishop of Passaic of the Ruthenians
 Basil Myron Schott, O.F.M., (1996-2002), appointed Archbishop of Pittsburgh of the Ruthenians
 John Michael Kudrick (2002-2016)
 Milan Lach, S.J. (2018–2023)
Kurt Burnette (Apostolic Administrator, 2023–present; Apostolic Administrator Sede vacante as of January 23, 2023)

Churches
St. Basil the Great Byzantine Catholic Church Sterling Heights, MI
Sacred Heart Byzantine Catholic Church Livonia, MI
St. Michael Byzantine Catholic Church Toledo
St. Louis Byzantine Catholic Mission St. Louis, Missouri
Cathedral of Saint John the Baptist Parma, Ohio
St. John the Baptist Byzantine Catholic Church Minneapolis, Minnesota
St. Mary Byzantine Catholic Church Marblehead, Ohio

See also 
 Byzantine Catholic Metropolitan Church of Pittsburgh
 Byzantine Catholic Archeparchy of Pittsburgh
 Byzantine Catholic Eparchy of Passaic
 Byzantine Catholic Eparchy of Phoenix
 Byzantine Catholic Exarchate of Saints Cyril and Methodius of Toronto

References

Sources and external links 
 Ruthenian Catholic Eparchy of Parma Official Site
 The Archeparchy of Pittsburgh
 Metropolia of Pittsburgh
 GCatholic, with Google map -data for all sections
 Eparchy of Parma (Ruthenian) at Catholic-Hierarchy.org

Parma
Parma
Parma, Ohio
Parma
Christian organizations established in 1969
Rusyn-American culture in Illinois
Rusyn-American culture in Ohio
1969 establishments in the United States
Eastern Catholicism in Ohio